Puente Madre is a village in the municipality of Villamediana de Iregua, in the province and autonomous community of La Rioja, Spain. As of 2019 had a population of 194 people.

References

Populated places in La Rioja (Spain)